Llanwnda may refer to:
Llanwnda, Gwynedd 
Llanwnda, Pembrokeshire